Nepytia pellucidaria, the false pine looper, is a moth of the family Geometridae. The species was first described by Alpheus Spring Packard in 1873. It is found in Canada (Nova Scotia, New Brunswick, Quebec and Ontario) and the north-eastern parts of the United States (including Maryland).

The wingspan is about 34–39 mm.

The larva feeds on pitch pine, red pine and possibly other hard pines.

External links
Larval Stage info

Ourapterygini
Taxa named by Alpheus Spring Packard
Moths described in 1873